LASD is the Los Angeles County Sheriff's Department, a US local law enforcement agency.

LASD may also refer to:

Leechburg Area School District
Lehighton Area School District
Littlestown Area School District
Lockheed Aeronautics Services Division, a part of Lockheed Corporation
Los Altos School District
Lufthansa Airport Services Dresden GmbH
FK Dinamo-Rīnuži/LASD, a football club in Riga, Latvia